Alpine Convent School is a co-educational private school in Gurgaon, Haryana, India. It was established in 1996 and has four branches; Sector 10, Sector 38, Sector 56 and Sector 67. It is affiliated to the Central Board of Secondary Education.

References

External links 
 

Schools in Gurgaon
Private schools in Haryana
Educational institutions established in 1996
1996 establishments in Haryana